HMS Miranda was a Doterel-class sloop of the Royal Navy, built at Devonport Dockyard and launched on 30 September 1879.

Design
The Doterel class was designed by Nathaniel Barnaby as a development of William Henry White's 1874 .  The graceful clipper bow of the Ospreys was replaced by a vertical stem and the engines were more powerful. The hull was of composite construction, with wooden planks over an iron frame.

Propulsion

Armament
Ships of the class were armed with two 7-inch (90 cwt) muzzle-loading rifled guns on pivoting mounts, and four 64-pounder muzzle-loading rifled guns (two on pivoting mounts, and two broadside). Four machine guns and one light gun completed the weaponry.

Sail plan
All the ships of the class were provided with a barque rig, that is, square-rigged foremast and mainmast, and fore-and-aft sails only on the mizzen mast.

Crew
Miranda would have had a normal complement of 140–150 men.

Construction
Miranda was ordered from Devonport Dockyard and laid down on 8 July 1878.  She was launched on 30 September 1879 and was commissioned on 22 July 1880.

Service
She commenced service on the Australia Station in September 1880. Miranda visited  a number of the Ellice Islands (present-day Tuvalu) in 1886. She left the Australia Station in 1886 and returned to England. By 1891, because of her slow speed and obsolete armament, she had been relegated to the Medway Reserve.  She was surveyed as a potential training ship in 1892, but found unfit.

Fate
She was sold to Reed of Portsmouth for breaking up on 24 September 1892.

References

Bastock, John (1988), Ships on the Australia Station, Child & Associates Publishing Pty Ltd; Frenchs Forest, Australia. 

 

1879 ships
Doterel-class sloops
Victorian-era sloops of the United Kingdom
Ships built in Plymouth, Devon